Andrew Ward (born 23 June 1981, in Dartford) is a former English cricketer. He was a right-handed batsman and wicket-keeper who played for Buckinghamshire.

Ward made a single List A appearance for the team, during the 2003 season, against Dorset. Ward did not bat or bowl in the match.

References
Andrew Ward at Cricket Archive 

1981 births
Living people
English cricketers
Buckinghamshire cricketers
Wicket-keepers
Sportspeople from Dartford